Sisily 2 km, released internationally as To Catch a Virgin Ghost, is a 2004 South Korean horror-comedy film about a gang that steals a large diamond and escapes to a small town named Sisily, where they encounter deceitful villagers with dark pasts. It was the directorial debut of Shin Jung-won.

References

External links
  
 
 
 

2004 films
2000s ghost films
2004 comedy horror films
Showbox films
South Korean ghost films
2004 directorial debut films
South Korean comedy horror films
2000s South Korean films
2000s Korean-language films